"Loyal" is a single by New Zealand singer/songwriter Dave Dobbyn, released in 1988 from the album of the same name. The song reached number 19 on the New Zealand charts and has since become a cult song for the nation.

Background
Dobbyn wrote the song in Sydney, with the opening harmonic progression coming about from playing with a newly bought guitar. He co-produced the single, and in retrospect is not entirely happy with the result, preferring live versions such as that from the Together in Concert: Live tour with Bic Runga and Tim Finn.

Music video
The music video for Loyal was directed by Kerry Brown and is a one-shot video of Dobbyn and a woman moving out of a house. It was met with mixed reception and there is some argument about the appropriateness of the imagery for the song. Dobbyn's patterned jersey also received some derision.

Legacy
In 2001, Loyal was voted the 3rd best New Zealand song of the 20th century by APRA, and featured on the related Nature's Best CD.  It was also included on the live album Together in Concert: Live, which was performed with Bic Runga and Tim Finn.

It was used in 2002 as the official song for the defending New Zealand team in the 2003 America's Cup yachting competition. There was some public unhappiness about the song's association with the campaign (especially given the team's subsequent loss). The song was used to bring to light that 9 of the 18 crew members of Swiss-based team Alinghi were New Zealanders, and all 9 were previously members of Team New Zealand between the years of 1995 and 2000.

However, in 2006, voters in an online survey of 3000 voted it NZ's best song.

Dobbyn has noted the adoption of "Loyal" into the wider New Zealand psyche:

References

External links
 Music Video (NZ On Screen)
 'The National Anthems', a commentary on top APRA New Zealand songs including "Loyal"
 Musical analysis of 'Loyal' on AudioCulture

1988 singles
APRA Award winners
Dave Dobbyn songs
1988 songs
CBS Records singles
Songs written by Dave Dobbyn